Renzo Barbera (Palermo, 19 April 1920 – Palermo, 20 May 2002) was an Italian businessman and the chairman of Palermo Football Club from 1970 to 1980. He was nicknamed "Presidentissimo" and "The Last Leopard".

During his presidency the "rosanero" team reached two Coppa Italia finals in 1974 (against Bologna) and in 1979 (against Juventus). After the experience as chairman of Palermo, he was elected president of the Sicilian Organising Committee of the 1990 FIFA World Cup. He died on 20 May 2002 of heart disease.

On 18 September 2002, the Palermo stadium La Favorita was renamed as Renzo Barbera.

References

Further reading 
 Bagnati G., Maggio V., Prestigiacomo V., Il Palermo racconta: storie, confessioni e leggende rosanero (2004)
 Angelini A., 101 gol che hanno cambiato la storia del calcio italiano (2010)
 Melati P., Vitale F., Vivi da morire (2015)

1920 births
2002 deaths
Businesspeople from Palermo
Italian football chairmen and investors
Palermo F.C. chairmen and investors